Hoffman Ledge is an arcuate flat-topped ridge,  long and  wide, located west of Dais Col in the Labyrinth of Wright Valley, McMurdo Dry Valleys, Antarctica. It was named by the Advisory Committee on Antarctic Names after J.H. (Jack) Hoffman of the Geophysics Division of the Department of Scientific and Industrial Research, superintendent of the New Zealand drilling team engaged in the McMurdo Dry Valleys Drilling Project, 1973–76.

References

Ridges of Victoria Land
McMurdo Dry Valleys